Alexis Phelut (born 31 March 1998) is a French athlete who competes in the steeplechase.

From Beaumont, Puy-de-Dôme, his club is Clermont Athletisme Auvergne. He achieved 2nd place for the men's 3000m steeplechase at the Meeting Iberoamericano in Huelva on 3 June 2021 behind Yemane Haileselassie. A week previously he had met the Olympic standard for the delayed Tokyo Olympics at a meeting in Oordegem. At the 2020 Olympic Games he finished third in his heat to qualify for the 3000m steeplechase final.

References

1998 births
Living people
French male steeplechase runners
People from Beaumont, Puy-de-Dôme
Athletes (track and field) at the 2020 Summer Olympics
Olympic athletes of France
Sportspeople from Puy-de-Dôme